Mill Cove is a small sea inlet in County Cork, Ireland.  It lies approximately three kilometers to the east of the village of Glandore and 45 kilometers WSW of Cork. A kilometer North up the Ballyvireen, which flows into the cove, stands the  ruined four storey fortified house, Coppingers Court. The inlet has, on its eastern side, a small wharf.

HMS Farnborough, the Q-ship was beached in the cove in 1917.

References 

Landforms of County Cork
Inlets of the Republic of Ireland